Albright Peak ( is located in the Teton Range, Grand Teton National Park, in the U.S. state of Wyoming. Albright Peak is the only mountain peak named for Horace M. Albright, the second director of the National Park Service. The peak is  SSE of Static Peak and towers to the northwest over Phelps Lake. The easiest climbing access to Albright Peak is via the Alaska Basin Trail.

References

Mountains of Wyoming
Mountains of Teton County, Wyoming